2009 Regional League Division 2 Bangkok Metropolitan Region ( or ไทยลีกดิวิชัน 2 กรุงเทพและปริมณฑล) is the 3rd Level League in Thailand. In 2009, contains 10 clubs from Bangkok Metropolitan region.

Changes from Last Season
from Khǒr Royal Cup (ถ้วย ข.) 2008
Kasetsart University Winner
Nakhon Sawan Rajabhat University Runner-Up

Stadium and Locations

Final league table

 Rules for classification: 1st points; 2nd head-to-head; 3rd goal difference; 4th goals scored

Results

See also

References

External links
  Football Association of Thailand

Bang
Regional League Bangkok Area Division seasons